The German Ice Hockey Hall of Fame, also called Eishockeymuseum in German, was founded in 1988 and is located in Augsburg. The hall honors individuals who have contributed to ice hockey in Germany, and displays memorabilia depicting contributions of players, coaches, referees and other important figures in the sport.

Notable inductees
There are 247 inductees into the hall of fame as of 2018. Notable inductees include:

Paul Ambros
Franz Baader
Ignaz Berndaner
Joachim von Bethmann-Hollweg
René Bielke
Helmut de Raaf
Hans Dobida
Jan-Åke Edvinsson
Sven Felski
Karl Friesen
Lorenz Funk
Erich Goldmann
Jozef Golonka
Bruno Guttowski
Dieter Hegen
Heinz Henschel
Uli Hiemer
Udo Kiessling
Josef Kompalla
Ēriks Koņeckis
Erich Kühnhackl
Peter Lee
Wolf-Dieter Montag
Klaus Merk
Roman Neumayer
Hartmut Nickel
Rainer Philipp
Roy Roedger
Erich Römer
Michael Rumrich
Marquardt Slevogt
Ján Starší
Rudolf Thanner
Xaver Unsinn
Stefan Ustorf
Ferenc Vozar
Heinz Weifenbach
Hans Zach

References

External links
German Ice Hockey Hall of Fame official website

1988 establishments in Germany
Ice hockey museums and halls of fame
Ice hockey in Germany
Halls of fame in Germany
Museums in Bavaria